Ruben Pieter Brekelmans (born 18 July 1986) is a Dutch politician who has served as a member of the House of Representatives since 2021 on behalf of the conservative-liberal People's Party for Freedom and Democracy (VVD). He previously worked as a political assistant and civil servant at a few government ministries. As a parliamentarian, he focuses his work on foreign affairs and migration.

Early life and education 
He was born in 1986 in Leidschendam, located close The Hague, and he grew up in the North Brabant village Kaatsheuvel. Brekelmans became a member of Youth Organisation Freedom and Democracy (JOVD), the VVD's independent youth organization, at age seventeen. He studied economics at Tilburg University, global politics at the London School of Economics, and obtained a Master of Public Administration degree in 2015 at the Harvard Kennedy School.

Career 
After graduating from Harvard, Brekelmans took a job as strategy consultant at The Boston Consulting Group's Amsterdam office. He subsequently served as political assistant of State Secretary for Justice and Security Mark Harbers and kept working at the Ministry of Justice and Security as director of the program Adaptive Asylum System after Harbers's resignation in May 2019. Brekelmans left the ministry in October 2020 to become program director Insight on Quality at the Ministry of Finance. Next to his job, he was chair of the VVD's thematic network on international affairs between 2017 and 2021, and he was on the committee that wrote his party's election program for the 2019 European Parliament election.

Brekelmans was the VVD's thirtieth candidate in the 2021 general election and was elected to the House of Representatives with 1,539 preference votes. He was sworn in on 31 March and became his party's spokesperson for foreign policy, international cultural policy, and extensions of foreign missions. Migration was later added to his specialties. During the Russian military build-up ahead of its 2022 invasion of Ukraine, Brekelmans advocated sending weapons to Ukraine, and he kept pleading for strong sanctions after the start of the invasion including closing the European Union's airspace for Russian airliners. Furthermore, Brekelmans was in support of quickly increasing spending on the Dutch military such that its budget would adhere to the NATO norm of 2% of GDP, and he wanted more security, defense, and migration cooperation in the European Union, although he opposed a European army. In an opinion piece, he wrote that he wanted to deport asylum seekers whose application had been rejected to make room for "real refugees" from Ukraine. He also raised the possibility of temporarily halting new asylum applications in light of capacity problems at asylum seekers' centers.

House committees 
In the House, Brekelmans is on the following committees:
 Committee for Defence
 Committee for European Affairs
 Committee for Foreign Affairs
 Committee for Foreign Trade and Development Cooperation
 Committee for Kingdom Relations
 Dutch parliamentary delegation to the NATO Assembly
 Dutch parliamentary delegation to the OSCE
 Contact Group France
 Contact Group United Kingdom
 Contact Group United States (chair)

Personal life 
Brekelmans lives in the North Brabant town Oisterwijk. He has a girlfriend and a daughter, who was born on the day before his election to the House.

References

External links 
 Personal website 

1986 births
21st-century Dutch politicians
Alumni of the London School of Economics
21st-century Dutch civil servants
Harvard Kennedy School alumni
Living people
Members of the House of Representatives (Netherlands)
People's Party for Freedom and Democracy politicians
Tilburg University alumni
People from Oisterwijk
Dutch management consultants